Los Negros Island is the third largest of the Admiralty Islands. It is significant because it contains the main airport of Manus Province on its eastern coastline, at Momote. It is connected to Lorengau, the capital of the province, on Manus Island via a highway and bridge across the Lonui Passage, which separates Los Negros from the larger Manus Island.

One of Australia's regional centres for asylum seekers caught in Australian waters, the Manus Island Regional Processing Centre, was situated on the island until it closed in November 2017. Remaining asylum seekers were  housed in accommodation in Lorengau.

History
Los Negros was formerly a Japanese base during World War II, and was heavily assaulted on February 29, 1944 by Allied forces, during the Battle of Los Negros which was the spearhead for the Admiralty Islands campaign.

After its capture by allied forces, Los Negros was developed over the spring and summer of 1944 into an important air and sea base that was used by allied forces until September 1945. Allied development included the creation of an advanced naval base, Manus Naval Base at Seeadler Harbor, a seaplane base at Lombrum Point
and an extended airfield to accommodate heavy aircraft built at Mokerang Plantation.

The Australian War Crimes Court held a series of trials of accused war criminals at Los Negros between June 1950 and April 1951.

References 

Admiralty Islands
Manus Province
Bismarck Archipelago
Islands of Papua New Guinea